Chatrapati Shivaji Maharaj uddanpul is in Nashik city, Dwarka area and located on National Highway 3 (India) It starts from Pandavleni caves and ends near Adgaon, it is India's first externally strutted segmental box girder Bridge used over 2100 and having capacity of 100 Ton each and India's Second Longest road bridge. It was approved by Atal Bihari Vajpayee in 2002.

References 

Transport in Nashik
Bridges in Maharashtra
Buildings and structures in Nashik
Monuments and memorials to Shivaji